Button man may refer to:

 Button Man, a story that has appeared in the comics anthology 2000 AD
 Pearly Kings and Queens

 American English slang for a hired killer

See also 
 Button Men, a dice game